Owen H. Johnson (July 3, 1929 – December 24, 2014) was an American politician who served as a longtime member of the New York State Senate. He represented the 4th State Senate district, which includes mostly the Town of Babylon in south-west Suffolk County.

Early life and education 
Johnson attended elementary school in West Babylon and high school in Babylon. He served in the United States Marine Corps from 1946 to 1948. After being honorably discharged, Johnson attended Hofstra College and graduated in 1956 with a B.A. in history and political science. In 1998, Hofstra awarded him an Honorary Doctor of Laws degree.

Career 
He was a member of the New York State Senate from 1973 to 2012, sitting in the 180th, 181st, 182nd, 183rd, 184th, 185th, 186th, 187th, 188th, 189th, 190th, 191st, 192nd, 193rd, 194th, 195th, 196th, 197th, 198th and 199th New York State Legislatures. He was the co-chairman and later Chairman Emeritus on the board of directors of the American Legislative Exchange Council (ALEC), a national association of legislators.

In 2011, Johnson voted against allowing same-sex marriage in New York during a Senate roll-call vote on the Marriage Equality Act, which passed after a close 33-29 vote. He did not seek reelection in the 2012 state elections.

Personal life 
Johnson and his wife Christel resided in West Babylon. They had two children: a son, Owen, and daughter, Chirsten.

Johnson died on December 24, 2014.

See also
 2009 New York State Senate leadership crisis

References

External links
New York State Senate: Owen H. Johnson

1929 births
2014 deaths
Republican Party New York (state) state senators
Politicians from Suffolk County, New York
People from West Babylon, New York
Hofstra University alumni
21st-century American politicians